Callispa pita, is a species of leaf beetle found in Sri Lanka.

Description
Body length is about 5.00 mm. Body small, elongate and yellowish brown. Eyes are prominent and black. Antennae black. Prothorax length is about 1.00 mm. Scutellum semicircular. Elytral length is about 3.50 mm. Elytra oblong with eight rows of punctures at each elytron base. Hind wings which are very small and transparent are about 4.00 mm long. Tarsi dark brown. Legs and ventrum are brown.

References 

Cassidinae
Insects of Sri Lanka
Beetles described in 1919